KSVU (90.1 FM) is an American community radio station broadcasting a variety format. Licensed to broadcast from Hamilton, Washington, United States, the station serves the Skagit Valley from Sedro Woolley to eastern Skagit County; the station is currently owned by the Board of Trustees of Skagit Valley College and is a sister-station of KSVR FM. The station started broadcasting in November 2011 from its studio located in Concrete, Washington. KSVU broadcasts from studios located in Concrete, Washington and is staffed by local volunteers and paid staff from Skagit Valley College.

Programming
KSVU offers a variety of music and informational programming, some of which are broadcast in conjunction with its sister-station, KSVR. The station also offers selected programming from NPR, including The Diane Rehm Show.

References

External links
 KSVU official website
 

SVU
Community radio stations in the United States